Tyrannosaurus Hives is the third full-length album by the Hives, released on 20 July 2004. It is their first album since Veni Vidi Vicious from 2000, and also their first original release on a major label.

If the front cover of the album is removed from the case and lined up with the back, one can see that there is an extra pair of legs, hinting at Randy Fitzsimmons' existence. "Diabolic Scheme" was featured in the Swedish vampire movie Frostbiten, whereas "B is for Brutus" and "Uptight" were both featured in the racing video game Gran Turismo 4. The song "No Pun Intended" was featured in the racing video game MotorStorm: Pacific Rift.

As of 2006 the album has sold 176,000 copies in United States.

Track listing
All songs by Randy Fitzsimmons

Personnel
Howlin' Pelle Almqvist – vocals
Nicholaus Arson – lead guitar, backing vocals
Vigilante Carlstroem – rhythm guitar, backing vocals
Dr. Matt Destruction – bass guitar
Chris Dangerous – drums
Björn Yttling – string arrangement
Andreas Forsman, Johan Moren, Rebecca Karlsson, Christoffer Öhman, Henrik Söderqvist – string performance
Pelle Gunnerfeldt – producer, audio mixing
Michael Ilbert – audio mixing
George Marino – audio mastering

Charts

Certifications

References

The Hives albums
2004 albums
Interscope Records albums
Polydor Records albums